Aberfeldy Watermill is located in the Scottish town of Aberfeldy, Perth and Kinross. Dating to 1826, it is now a Category A listed building. It is now a book shop, gallery and café.

The mill was restored in the 1980s by a miller from Cupar in Fife.

After its renovation during 2004, it was opened in its current format the following year by Michael Palin. In 2009, it was awarded UK Independent Bookshop of the Year and, in 2016, The New Yorker listed it in its "75 Greatest Bookstores in the World".

See also
List of Category A listed buildings in Perth and Kinross
List of listed buildings in Aberfeldy, Perth and Kinross

References

External links
Aberfeldy Watermill – official website

Flour mills in the United Kingdom
19th-century establishments in Scotland
Watermill
Category A listed buildings in Perth and Kinross